Victor B. Cline (1925–2013) was a University of California, Berkeley Ph D in Psychology, a research scientist with the George Washington University’s Human Resources Research Office, and an Emeritus Professor in Psychology at the University of Utah. His private clinical practice was in Salt Lake City, Utah.

Career
Victor Cline was involved with multiple family-oriented organizations, such as Marriage and Family Enrichment (which he co-founded) and The Lighted Candle Society. Cline's research area was on sex addiction, especially topics pertaining to pornography. Cline was a clinical psychologist and psychotherapist specializing in marital and family counseling and the treatment of sexual compulsions and addictions. He also worked with the victims of sexual abuse and sexual assault. Cline was also a behavioral scientist with publications in the area of “media and pornography effects.” As a practitioner, he was involved in the treatment of sexual addicts or compulsives including many pedophiles and their victims.

Due to his studies on the effects of pornography, Cline has been utilized as an expert witness in court cases and by the US Judiciary Committee. Cline's opinion was requested by the Commission on Child Online Protection, which is associated with San Jose State University. Cline provided the following testimony:

According to Cline, online pornography can plunge a person into the pornography cycle of addiction, escalation, desensitization, and acting out sexually.  The cost of addiction includes "divorce, loss of family and problems with the law," and it escalates so that the addict requires more deviancy in order to get a "high" or "sexual turn-on."

Cline was a member of the Church of Jesus Christ of Latter-day Saints.

Publications

 

Cline, VB (1994). "Pornography effects: Empirical and clinical evidence" In D. Zillmann, J. Bryant, & ACHuston (Eds.), Media, children and the family: Social scientific, psychodynamic and clinical perspectives pp. 229–247

Notes

External links
Pornography's Effects on Adults and Children by Victor Cline.
Treatment and Healing of Pornographic and Sexual Addictions by Victor Cline.
Publications on Google Scholar.

George Washington University faculty
American sexologists
University of Utah faculty
University of California, Berkeley alumni
1925 births
2013 deaths
Latter Day Saints from California
Latter Day Saints from Washington, D.C.
Latter Day Saints from Utah